The 1973 Giro d'Italia was the 56th edition of the Giro d'Italia, one of cycling's Grand Tours. The Giro began with a prologue two-man team time trial in Verviers on 18 May, and Stage 10 occurred on 29 May with a stage to Lanciano. The race finished in Trieste on 9 June.

Prologue
18 May 1973 — Verviers,  (TTT)

Stage 1
19 May 1973 — Verviers to Cologne,

Stage 2
20 May 1973 — Cologne to Luxembourg,

Stage 3
21 May 1973 — Luxembourg to Strasbourg,

Stage 4
22 May 1973 — Geneva to Aosta,

Rest day
23 May 1970

Stage 5
24 May 1973 — St. Vincent to Milan,

Stage 6
25 May 1973 — Milan to Iseo,

Stage 7

Stage 8
27 May 1973 —  to Monte Carpegna,

Stage 9
28 May 1973 — Carpegna to Alba Adriatica,

Stage 10
29 May 1973 — Alba Adriatica to Lanciano,

References

1973 Giro d'Italia
Giro d'Italia stages